The Wandering Light (German: Das wandernde Licht) is a 1916 German silent drama film directed by Robert Wiene and starring Henny Porten, Bruno Decarli and Theodor Becker. It was based on a short story by Ernst von Wildenbruch. A Count marries a woman who come to wrongly believe that he is mad.

Cast
 Henny Porten – Anna von Glassner 
 Bruno Decarli – Baron von Fahrenwald 
 Theodor Becker – Kammerdiener des Barons 
 Emil Rameau – Major von Glassner 
 Elsa Wagner – Frau von Glassner

References

Bibliography
 Jung, Uli & Schatzberg, Walter. Beyond Caligari: The Films of Robert Wiene. Berghahn Books, 1999.

External links

1916 films
1916 drama films
German drama films
Films of the German Empire
German silent feature films
Films directed by Robert Wiene
Films based on short fiction
German black-and-white films
Silent drama films
1910s German films
1910s German-language films